Shaheed Krishan Chand Memorial Stadium (previously known as the Paddal Ground) is a cricket ground in Mandi, Himachal Pradesh, India.  The ground first held a first-class match in November 1986 when Himachal Pradesh played Jammu and Kashmir in the 1986/87 Ranji Trophy.  The ground has held ten further first-class matches, the last of which came in the 2001/02 Ranji Trophy between Himachal Pradesh and Jammu and Kashmir.  The first List A match held on the ground came in the 1987/88 Deodhar Trophy when the North Zone played the South Zone.  Himachal Pradesh first played a List A match there in 1994/95 Ranji Trophy one-day competition when Punjab were the visiting team.  Between the 1994/95 season and the 1999/00 season, Himachal Pradesh played five List A fixtures there.  The last game in that format to be held there came in the 2001/02 Deodhar Trophy when East Zone played the South Zone. It has 800m track.

References

External links
Shaheed Krishan Chand Memorial Stadium at ESPNcricinfo
Shaheed Krishan Chand Memorial Stadium at CricketArchive

Cricket grounds in Himachal Pradesh
Buildings and structures in Mandi district
1995 establishments in Himachal Pradesh
Sports venues completed in 1995
20th-century architecture in India